Kochhart is a river near Tübingen, Baden-Württemberg, Germany. The small river eroded a valley, which is a Naturschutzgebiet for geological and biological reasons. It flows into the Ammer near Ammerbuch.

Nature reserves in Baden-Württemberg
Valleys of Baden-Württemberg
Rivers of Baden-Württemberg
Rivers of Germany